The Montech water slope is a type of canal inclined plane built on the Canal de Garonne, in the commune of Montech, Tarn-et-Garonne, Southwest France. It is managed by the publicly owned Voies navigables de France and by-passes a series of five  locks. The slope is used for larger vessels up to 40 metres in length, while smaller boats continue to use the locks.

The slope has been out of service since an engine failure in 2009, and was scheduled to reopen in the summer of 2020.

Operating principles
The principle of the water slope is based on a sloping channel up or down which a wedge of water retained by an (almost) watertight gate is moved. This technique was invented in the 19th century by the German engineer Julius Greve and described by the French engineer Jean Aubert in 1961. The Montech water slope was inaugurated in July 1974.

An evenly sloping concrete channel is fitted with a gate at the top, round which a continuous trickle of water is allowed to flow, to compensate for any leakage. The lower gate, which can be lifted, is mounted on a yoke between two ex-railway locomotives, which run on concrete tracks ether side of the channel.

To allow a boat to ascend, the lower gate is lifted, the boat enters the channel, and then the gate is lowered behind it, leaving it floating on an isolated a wedge of water. The locomotives ascend the slope, pushing the water wedge in front of the lower gate. When the water level in the wedge matches that of the upper canal, the upper gate is opened and the boat is allowed to float free. To descend the process is reversed.

Details of the machinery

By virtue of its power and ingenuity the slope's mobile barrier is the key to the system. It consists of:
 Two locomotives, rigidly connected together by a cross-piece which spans the channel, with the locomotives travelling on the channel's banks.
 The gate, which acts as a big slide-valve, connected to the rigid cross-member by an arm.
 A horizontal beam serving as a shock absorber between the boats and the gate.

Each diesel electric locomotive has a power of  distributed to drive motors on each of the four axles, each with two large pneumatic tyres.

The three contact faces of the gate with the channel are equipped with seals to keep the wedge of water in place. The gate is raised or lowered using a hydraulic ram.

The shock absorber is a hydraulically levelled hinged metal frame. It allows boats to be connected to the gate during ascents and descents. An electronic system keeps motion gentle and smooth. Finally triple brakes slow the system without jerks.

Design features
 Weight of the engines: 200 tonnes
 Pushing effort: 60 tonnes
 Speed: 4.5 km/h
 Volume of water moved: 1,500 m
 Slope of the channel: 3%
 Height of the slope: 13.30 m
 Depth of water wedge moved: 3.75 m
 Length of the water wedge: 125 metres
 Power of the locomotives: 2 × 
 Length of the channel: 443 m
 Width of the channel: 6 m
 Duration of passage: about 6 minutes
 Length, width and capacity of the boats: 38.5 m, 5.5 m and 250 tonnes.

Publicity
The Montech water slope was featured in an episode of the 2005 BBC television series Rick Stein's French Odyssey.

Shown as a segment of "Mysteries of the Abandoned" (2018) S2:E7 - Amazon Ghost Town Science Channel

Also featured in an episode of "Abandoned Engineering" on the Yesterday channel in the UK (Series 2, episode 6).

Gallery

See also

Fonserannes water slope
Garonne
Canal du Midi

Further reading

References

External links
 
 Canal du Midi

Canal inclined planes
Locks of France